The United States Department of Commerce is a Cabinet department of the United States government.

Department of Commerce may also refer to:
 Department of Commerce (Australia), 1932-1942
 Department of Commerce (Western Australia)
 Ohio Department of Commerce
 Oklahoma Department of Commerce
 West Virginia Department of Commerce
 Wisconsin Department of Commerce

See also 
 Ministry of Trade and Industry